Crataegus pennsylvanica, known as the Pennsylvania thorn, is a species of hawthorn native to Delaware, New York, North Carolina, Ontario, Ohio, and Pennsylvania, that grows to about 8 m in height. The mature trees have few thorns.

This species has often been confounded with C. mollis, but the two species have separate native ranges except for an area of overlap in northeastern Ohio.

Images

References

submollis
Flora of North America